Raoul A. Robinson (September 25, 1928 in Saint Helier, Jersey  - 25 July 2014) was a
Canadian/British plant scientist with more than forty years of wide-ranging global experience in crop improvement for both commercial and subsistence agriculture. He is best known for his application of system theory to crop pathosystems and the elucidation of the concepts of  horizontal and vertical resistance and their implication on breeding for durable resistance.

Education

He was educated at Victoria College, Jersey, and graduated from the University of Reading in 1951.

Career

Over the course of his adventurous and productive career, Robinson concentrated most intensively on maize, potatoes, beans, and coffee. In addition, he has worked with cotton, tomatoes, dates, wheat, alfalfa, cocoa, cassava, coconut, tobacco, taro, sweet potato, vanilla, black pepper, and other crops.

Books

Articles

References 

1928 births
2014 deaths
Canadian phytopathologists
Jersey academics
Alumni of the University of Reading
20th-century Canadian botanists
21st-century Canadian botanists
People from Saint Helier